Vrutok is a village in the municipality of Gostivar, North Macedonia. The village is situated on the slopes of Mount Bistra by the Korab mountains, near the town of Gostivar.

Geography 

Its importance belongs to the water streams where the river Vardar (388 km), a major river in North Macedonia and Greece, rises. Nearby is the hydro power plant Vrutok with 49 MW capacity.

Demographics
According to ethnographer Vasil Kanchov's data from 1900, the village was inhabited by 460 Bulgarian Exarchists, 300 Muslim Albanians and 24 Roma people. 

As of the 2021 census, Vrutok had 640 residents with the following ethnic composition:
Albanians 369
Macedonians 203
Persons for whom data are taken from administrative sources 56
Turks 9
Others 3

According to the 2002 census, the village had a total of 1127 inhabitants. Ethnic groups in the village include:

Albanians 846
Macedonians 276
Serbs 3
Others 2

References

External links

Villages in Gostivar Municipality
Albanian communities in North Macedonia